Cobb Divinity School (also known as Bates Theological Seminary or the Free Will Baptist Bible School) was a Baptist theological institute. Founded in 1840, it was a Free Will Baptist graduate school affiliated with several Free Baptist institutions throughout its history. Cobb was part of Bates College in Lewiston, Maine, United States from 1870 until 1908 when it merged with the college's Religion Department.

The school created one of the first models for a Bible school in the United States. The school had a close relationship with the University of Chicago with many Baptist theology students and faculty going back and forth between the schools.

History
The divinity school was founded by the Free Will Baptists in Parsonsfield, Maine in 1840 as a library department and graduate bible school of the Parsonsfield Seminary with Moses Smart serving as the first leader of the school. From 1842 to 1844, the divinity school was located in Dracut, Massachusetts. In 1844, the divinity school moved again to Whitestown, New York and became part of the Whitestown Seminary, where it was known as the Free Baptist Biblical School. From 1854 to 1870, the divinity school was located in New Hampton, New Hampshire, and affiliated with the New Hampton Institute.

The school and its library were removed to Lewiston in 1870 and became a graduate school (known as Bates Theological Seminary until 1888) of Bates College. In 1888, it was renamed Cobb Divinity School in honor of Jonathan Leavitt Haskell Cobb (1824-1897), a prominent businessman at the Bates Mill in Lewiston who had donated $25,000 to the Divinity School at Bates. In 1891, President of Bates College Oren B. Cheney amended the school's charter requiring that Bates' president and a majority of the trustees be Free Will Baptists. Following Cheney's retirement, the amendment was revoked in 1907 at the request of his successor, President George C. Chase, and the board of trustees. In 1907, the Maine Legislature amended the college's charter removing the requirement for the president and majority of the trustees to be Free Will Baptists, thereby allowing the school to qualify for Carnegie Foundation funding of professor's pensions. Cobb Divinity School was disbanded in 1908, with much of its curricula and faculty and library becoming the Bates College Religion Department. In 1911, the Northern Free Will Baptist Conference merged with the Northern Baptist Conference, now known as the American Baptist Churches USA. Bates remained nominally affiliated with the Baptist tradition until 1970 when the college catalogue no longer described the school as a "Christian college".

Images

Notable people
Alfred W. Anthony (1885), pastor, professor, and author
George H. Ball (1847), pastor, teacher of President James A. Garfield and First Lady Lucretia Garfield
John Jay Butler, Arminian theologian, professor at Cobb and Hillsdale
George Colby Chase, second president of Bates College
Oren B. Cheney (1846), abolitionist, founder of Bates College
Lewis Penick Clinton (1897), African Bassa prince, missionary in Liberia
George T. Day (1847), pastor, writer at the Morning Star, professor at Bates
Ransom Dunn (1840), President of Rio Grande College and Hillsdale College, teacher of President James A. Garfield 
John Fullonton (1849), Professor and Dean at Cobb Divinity School
Frank Sandford, preacher, founder of "The Kingdom"

See also
Smithville Seminary

References

Anthony, Alfred Williams, Bates College and Its Background, (Philadelphia: Judson Press, 1936).

External links
Cobb Divinity School records at Edmund S. Muskie Archives & Special Collections Library, Bates College
Freewill Baptist records at Edmund S. Muskie Archives & Special Collections Library, Bates College
Info about the Divinity School
Bates Religion Department
Former Cobb Divinity School Building 1870-1894
Former Cobb Divinity School Building 1894-1908

1908 disestablishments in Maine
Bates College
Defunct private universities and colleges in Maine
Educational institutions established in 1840
Free Will Baptist schools
Seminaries and theological colleges in Maine
Seminaries and theological colleges affiliated with the American Baptist Churches USA
Educational institutions disestablished in 1908
1840 establishments in Maine
Universities and colleges in Oneida County, New York